Sante Geronimo Caserio (8 September 187316 August 1894) was an Italian anarchist and the assassin of Marie François Sadi Carnot, President of the French Third Republic. Caserio was born in Motta Visconti, Lombardy. On 24 June 1894, he fatally stabbed President Carnot after a banquet, to avenge the executions of anarchist bombers Auguste Vaillant and Émile Henry.

Biography
Sante Caserio was a Lombardy-born son of a peasant family, who had many brothers and sisters. His father was a boatman who died of pellagra, at the time a common disease among farmers whose poor diet was often almost exclusively corn. At ten years old, Sante Caserio left the family home and went to Milan, where he got a job as an apprentice baker and had his first contacts with anarchists.

In Milan he joined a small group called "On Foot" (at the time signifying "without money"). Pietro Gori, referring to Caserio, remembered him as a generous person. Among the workers and unemployed, he divided bread and anarchist pamphlets he printed with his meager salary. In 1892 he was sentenced to eight months in prison for distributing anarchist leaflets. Identified and singled out during a public demonstration, he was forced to flee from Italy at the age of 18. Declared a deserter, he first went to Switzerland and sought a job as a baker in Vienne. He then moved to Lyon on July 21, 1893 where he worked as a messenger.

Trial and execution
At his trial, Caserio described the assassination in detail:
He also stated to those in attendance:Well, if the rulers can use against us rifles, shackles and prisons, we must, we anarchists to defend our lives, we must stick to our principles? No. On the contrary, our response to the rulers will be dynamite, pump, stiletto, dagger. In short, we must do everything possible to destroy the bourgeoisie and the government. You who are representatives of bourgeois companies, if you want my head, you can take it!He never attempted to deny his actions or ask the judges for mercy. He was offered the opportunity to plead insane, in exchange for giving the names of some of his accomplices, but he refused. He told the police "Caserio is a baker, never an informer." The Board of Pardons decided against all appeals for clemency on 14 August. Caserio was executed by guillotine in Lyon at precisely 5am, 16 August 1894. In front of the guillotine, he exclaimed "Coraggio cugini—evviva l'anarchia!" ("Courage, cousins—long live anarchy!") His death mask is now in possession of Jean-Marie Le Pen, the former leader of the French party National Front.

References

External links
 

1873 births
1894 deaths
People from the Province of Milan
Italian anarchists
Italian assassins
Anarchist assassins
Executed anarchists
People executed by guillotine
Italian people executed abroad
People executed by the French Third Republic
19th-century executions by France
Executed assassins
Italian people convicted of murder
People convicted of murder by France
Assassins of presidents
Illegalists
Executed Italian people
People executed by France by decapitation
1894 murders in France